Ronald Cooper (28 August 1938 – 13 April 2018) was an English professional football player and manager.

Career
Born in Peterborough, Cooper played as a defender for Peterborough United and Stamford Town, before managing Bourne.

References

1938 births
2018 deaths
English footballers
English football managers
Peterborough United F.C. players
English Football League players
Association football defenders
Sportspeople from Peterborough